Budish is a surname. Notable people with the surname include:

 Armond Budish (born 1953), American politician
 Eric Budish, American educator
 Jacob M. Budish (AKA J.M. Budish), 20th-century American labor economist
 Zach Budish (born 1991), American ice hockey player